The Northern Arizona Lumberjacks men's basketball team represents Northern Arizona University, located in Flagstaff, Arizona, in NCAA Division I men's competition. The school's team has competed in the Big Sky Conference since 1970. The team's most recent appearance in the NCAA Division I men's basketball tournament was in 2000. Northern Arizona also appeared in the NCAA tournament in   1998. In 2023, the Lumberjacks have reached the Big Sky conference tournament title game as a Cinderella team as they were the 9th seed in the tournament. The Lumberjacks are currently led by head coach Shane Burcar who replaced Jack Murphy in June 2019. NAU Lumberjack basketball games are broadcast on KAFF Country Legends 93.5/AM 930 in Flagstaff, Fun Oldies 1450 AM/100.9 in Prescott and Money Radio 1510AM in Phoenix, with commentary provided by the "Voice of the Lumberjacks" Mitch Strohman, Coach Dave Brown with the play-by-play and Dave Zorn, host of the NAU Halftime Report. All games can be also heard online at KAFFLegends.com

Postseason

NCAA tournament results

The Lumberjacks have appeared in two NCAA Tournaments, with a combined record of 0–2.

NIT results
The Lumberjacks have appeared in the National Invitation Tournament (NIT) three times, with a combined record of 0–3.

CIT results
The Lumberjacks have appeared in the CollegeInsider.com Postseason Tournament (CIT) twice, with a combined record of 4–2.

NAIA Tournament results
The Lumberjacks have appeared in the NAIA Tournament four times, with a combined record of 7–4.

References

External links